Li He ( – ) was a Chinese poet of the mid-Tang dynasty. His courtesy name was Changji, and he is also known as Guicai and Shigui.

He was prevented from taking the imperial examination due to a naming taboo. He died very young, and was noted for his sickly appearance.

He was a diligent poet, going out on journeys during the day and, when a line of poetry came to him, jotting it down, and completing the poems when he arrived home in the evening. His poems famously explored ghostly, supernatural and fantastic themes.

His popularity and place in the Chinese literary canon has fluctuated throughout the centuries. His idiosyncratic style of poetry was frequently imitated in China until the Qing dynasty. During this era, the popularity of his poetry suffered from a change in literary tastes, with his works notably being excluded from the influential Three Hundred Tang Poems, but there was a revival of interest in him in the twentieth century. He was among the Tang poets most admired by Mao Zedong.

Sources 
Chapter 137 of the Old Book of Tang and chapter 203 of the New Book of Tang each give a brief outline of the biography of Li He.

Li Shangyin, a poet of the following generation, also wrote a Short Biography of Li He. Du Mu, in 831, wrote a preface to Li's collected poems, which is more removed than the affectionate account written by Li Shangyin, but provides very little biographical information and is more focused on Li's appeal as a poet. Both the official histories are heavily dependent on these earlier records, particularly on Li Shangyin's account.

Names 
His courtesy name was Changji, and he is also known by a combination of his surname and courtesy name, Li Changji.

He was also known as Guicai ("devilish talent") by contrast of his morbid poetic style to Li Bai's Tiancai ( "heavenly talent") and Bai Juyi's Rencai (人才 "humanly talent"). This title was given him by the Song scholar  in his work .

He was also dubbed the "Ghost of Poetry", while Li Bai was called the "Immortal of Poetry" and Du Fu the "Sage of Poetry".

Biography

Background and early life
His family were of distant royal descent (from the Li family who were the ruling dynastic family of the Tang Dynasty), but his branch's fortunes had declined early on, and by Li He's time they were of low rank. Both the Tang state histories refer to him as a "descendant of Zheng Wang", but there is dispute as to the identity of Zheng Wang. The theory with more support among scholars is that it refers to Zheng Xiao Wang Liang (zh), an uncle of Li Yuan, the first Tang emperor; another theory is that it refers to the thirteenth son of Li Yuan, Zheng Wang Yuan Yi (zh).

He was born in 790 or 791. It seems likely that he was born in the year of the Horse, as some twenty-three of his surviving poems use the horse as a symbol for the poet. A native of Fuchang County (west of modern-day Yiyang County, Henan Province), he started composing poetry at the age of seven, and by around 15 he was being compared to the yuefu master Li Yi.

Political career 
When Li was 20, he attempted to take the Imperial Examination, but was forbidden from doing so because of a naming taboo: the first character (jin) of his father's given name (Jinsu) was homophonous with the first character of Jinshi, the name of the degree that would have been conferred on him had he passed. Ueki et al. (1999) speculate that this was a pretext devised by rivals, who were jealous of his poetic skill, to prevent him from sitting the examination.

Han Yu, who admired his poetry, wrote Hui Bian to encourage him to take the exam, but Li was ultimately unsuccessful. He served only three years, in the low-ranking office of Fenglilang before returning to his hometown.

Sickness and death 
He is described as having a very sickly appearance: he was supposedly very thin, had a unibrow, and let his fingernails grow long. Li He died a low-ranking and poor official in 816 or 817, at the age of 26 or 27. The Short Biography of Li He reports that at the hour of his death he was visited by a figure in scarlet who told him that Shangdi had summoned him to heaven to write poetry.

Poetry 

In literary history, Li is generally considered a poet of the so-called Middle Tang period, which spanned the late-eighth and early-ninth centuries. Among his poetic influences were his older contemporary Meng Jiao and the aforementioned Han Yu. Other sources that have been identified as influencing Li's poetry were the shamanistic elements of the Chu Ci and the idiosyncratic poetry of Li Bai.

About 240 of his poems survive. The New Book of Tang reports that few of his poems survived because of their strangeness and because of Li's early death. An anecdote in the Taiping Guangji records that a cousin of Li's was asked to compile a collection of his poems, but because he did not like Li personally he eventually threw what had been collected in the privy.

There are two extant anthologies of his poems: the Collected Songs and Verses of Li He and the Wai Ji.

The Short Biography of Li He describes him as a diligent poet, who carried an old brocade bag around with him, and when a line of poetry came to him he would jot it down and put it in this bag. After getting home, he would arrange these lines into a poem.

His poetry is unique, filled with fantastic and unusual imagery, which is where he gets his nickname "Guicai" (see above). Virtually none of his surviving poems are in regulated verse form, and his poems make frequent use of inauspicious words such as "aging" and "death". In poems like "Tianshang yao" and "Meng tian", he wrote evocatively of the worlds of gods and Buddhas.

He also gave eerie descriptions of the world of ghosts in his poems "Qiu lai" and "Shen xian qu". The spiritual symbolism Li employed in the latter poem has been called "nearly impenetrable".

"Shen xian qu" was the name of a popular folk song going back at least as far as the Six Dynasties period, and Li's poem borrows the name of this song. The song originated in the Nanjing area, as a ritual song meant to be played at religious ceremonies to invite the favour of the gods. Li's poem describes the supernatural world but this is not the case with the original folk song.

He frequently combined colour and feeling imagery in his poetry, as can be seen in his poems "Tianshang yao" (see above) and "Qin wang yin jiu".

His poetic style was dubbed Changji-ti by later critics, after his courtesy name. The Song commentator Yan Yu listed this as one of the individual author-based styles of poetry that was frequently imitated.

Reception 
Several modern Western and Japanese critics, including A. C. Graham, Naotarō Kudō, and J.D. Frodsham, have claimed that Li's poetry was not widely read until the modern era, but this is not entirely accurate. In a 1994 survey, Wu Qiming pointed out that Li was in premodern China more subject to imitation than to neglect.

Tang and Song dynasties 
Two poets of the generation following Li He, Du Mu and Li Shangyin, commemorated Li in their prose writings: a preface to Li's collected poems and a short biography of Li, respectively. Du Mu's preface in particular is taken as proof that Li's poetry was being compiled and edited within a few decades of his death, as internal textual evidence dates the preface to 831. The Tang author Pi Rixiu also wrote about Li He's poetry alongside that of Li Bai in his critical work "Liu Zao Qiang Bei".

He was also one of a group of Tang poets frequently quoted in the lyrics of Song-era musicians such as Zhou Bangyan (1056–1121). Yan Yu, in his work Canglang Shihua, contrasted Li to the earlier poet Li Bai. The earliest surviving edition of Li's poetry was collected and annotated in the Southern Song dynasty.

Yuan and Ming dynasties 
Many shi poets of the Yuan dynasty emulated Li's poetic style. These included Cheng Tinggui, Yang Weizhen, and Gu Ying, as well as the early Ming poet Gao Qi.

The Ming scholar Hu Yinglin read Li's poetry politically as "the tones of a ruined state" and recognized that Li's poetic style was especially influential during the latter years of various dynasties.

Qing dynasty 
There was an upswing in popularity of Li's poetry from the late Ming to the mid-Qing dynasties. A great many newly annotated collections of Li's poetry appeared during this period, and his poetry was widely imitated. The scholar  wrote a five-volume commentary on his poetry.

Around the mid-Qing dynasty, though, Li's poetry began to fall out of favour with the literary establishment. The anthologist Shen Deqian included a scant ten of Li's poems in his influential work . Shen was highly critical of his contemporaries' tendency to imitate Li's poetry. Li's poetry was also conspicuously absent from the Three Hundred Tang Poems, the arbiter of poetic tastes in the late Qing and early twentieth century.

Modern era 
Along with Li Bai and Li Shangyin, Li He was one of the "Three Lis" admired by Mao Zedong. In 1968, Roger Waters of the rock band Pink Floyd borrowed lines from Li's poetry to create the lyrics for the song "Set the Controls for the Heart of the Sun".

In his article on Li for the Chūgoku Bunkashi Daijiten, Japanese sinologist Kazuyuki Fukazawa called him "the representative poet of the Middle Tang". According to French sinologist François Jullien, Li He's poetry was readmitted to the Chinese literary canon "at the end of the nineteenth century ... [when] ...  Western notions of romanticism [allowed] the Chinese to reexamine this poet, allowing the symbolism of his poems to speak at last, freeing his imaginary world from the never-ending quest for insinuations." Paul W. Kroll, in his chapter on Tang poetry for The Columbia History of Chinese Literature, called Li "[t]he most eccentric poet of the T'ang, perhaps in all of Chinese poetry", and dubbed him "the Chinese Mallarmé" for his almost inscrutable poetic style and use of imagery.

Notes

References

Works cited

Further reading

External links 

  Books of the Quan Tangshi at the Chinese Text Project that include collected poems of Li He:
 Book 390
 Book 391
 Book 392
 Book 393
 Book 394
 Biography
 
 

790s births
816 deaths
Tang dynasty poets
Writers from Luoyang
Poets from Henan
9th-century Chinese poets